Shone An (20 September 1983 – 1 June 2015) was a Taiwanese singer, actor and television host.

Early life 

On 20 September 1983, An was born in East District, Tainan. He was the only child in his family. His birth name was Huang Yi-cheng (黃益承). During his childhood, he was primarily raised by his grandparents.

His father is a businessman and politician.

An graduated from Fu Jen Catholic University with a degree in philosophy.

Career 

From 2001 to 2005, he was a member of the mandopop boy band Comic Boyz. He also appeared in many movie, television and theatre productions such as Case Sensitive (2011), Rhapsody of Marriage (2012) and Turn Around (2014). He was also a guest host on 100% Entertainment.

Shone was close friends with Ady An and Joe Chen.

Death 

On 1 June 2015, Shone An died of liver cancer at home, in Tainan, aged 31. His funeral was held a week later on 8 June 2015 and attended by fellow Comic Boyz members Kingone Wang and Peter Chang.

References

1983 births
2015 deaths
Taiwanese male singers
Taiwanese Mandopop singers
Taiwanese male film actors
Taiwanese male television actors
Taiwanese male stage actors
Fu Jen Catholic University alumni
Deaths from liver cancer
Deaths from cancer in Taiwan
Musicians from Tainan
Male actors from Tainan